Bryson Rashon Keeton (born February 24, 1993) is an American businessman who is currently a partner at an international venture capital investment conglomerate Venturerock.  Keeton is a former American football cornerback who is currently a free agent. Keeton was signed by the New York Jets as an undrafted free agent in 2016. He played college football at Montana State.

Early years
Keeton was a three-time all-league defensive back at Bakersfield Ridgeview high school in Bakersfield, California.

Professional career
The New York Jets signed Keeton as an undrafted free agent following a tryout during their rookie minicamp. Keeton was waived on September 3, 2016 as part of the final roster cuts and was signed to the practice squad the following day. He was promoted to the active roster on December 30, 2016.

On July 30, 2017, Keeton was waived/injured by the Jets and placed on injured reserve.

On May 7, 2018, Keeton was waived by the Jets.

On September 6, 2022, Keeton became a Partner at an international venture capital investment conglomerate Venturerock.

Personal life
His cousin Tony Brackens played eight seasons for the Jacksonville Jaguars in the NFL.

References

External links
Montana State Bobcats bio
Nevada Wolf Pack bio
New York Jets bio

1993 births
Living people
American football cornerbacks
New York Jets players